Guyum may refer to:
Güyüm, Azerbaijan
Guyum, Iran